Menzi Dlamini (born 21 February 1971) is a Swazi sprinter. He competed in the men's 200 metres at the 2004 Summer Olympics.

References

1971 births
Living people
Athletes (track and field) at the 2004 Summer Olympics
Swazi male sprinters
Olympic athletes of Eswatini
Place of birth missing (living people)